Temi Lasisi (born 9 May 2001) is an Irish rugby union player, currently playing for United Rugby Championship and European Rugby Champions Cup side Leinster. His preferred position is prop.

Leinster
Lemisi was named in the Leinster Rugby academy for the 2021–22 season. He made his debut in the re-arranged Round 9 of the 2021–22 United Rugby Championship against . Lasisi had previously played as a Number 8 before moving to prop. A student at Technological University Dublin he played his junior rugby for Enniscorthy before switching to Lansdowne. Previously, Lasisi had wished to be a footballer, before switching to rugby as an eleven year old.

References

External links
itsrugby.co.uk Profile

2001 births
Living people
People from Enniscorthy
Irish rugby union players
Leinster Rugby players
Rugby union props
Rugby union players from County Wexford